Lift a Sail is the ninth studio album by American rock band Yellowcard. This was the band's first album without drummer Longineu W. Parsons III, who left the band in March 2014.

Background
On March 13, 2014, it was announced that drummer Longineu W. Parsons III left Yellowcard to pursue "other musical interests". A week later, the group signed a multi-album deal with independent label Razor & Tie, scheduling a new album in the fall. Razor & Tie owners Cliff Chenfeld and Craig Balsam said that the band "rock the way we like it—with energy, hooks and attitude. They are total pros and we couldn't be more proud to work with them". On March 25, it was announced that Nate Young of Anberlin would play drums for Yellowcard's next album.

Sessions for Lift a Sail were held at The Casita, and EastWest Studios, with producer Neal Avron. Erich Talaba acted as the main engineer, with assistance from Scott Skrzynski and Wil Anspach. Avron mixed the recordings, before Ted Jensen mastered the album at Sterling Sound in New York City. On May 16, guitarist Ryan Mendez announced that the band had finished recording.

Release
Between June and August, the group performed on Warped Tour. On August 1, the group posted a teaser for their upcoming album. Three days later, the album's title, Lift a Sail was revealed, and that it would be released in September. Another teaser for the album was posted on August 14. On September 9, "Make Me So" was made available for streaming. On the same day, "One Bedroom" was released to radio. On September 22, "Crash the Gates" was made available for streaming via Alternative Press. Lift a Sail was made available for streaming via Pandora Radio on September 29. On October 1, a music video was released for "One Bedroom". Alternative Press writer Matt Crane said the video "aligns the band with Invisible Children, who work to end the violent reign of Joseph Kony and his Lord’s Resistance Army in Africa".

Lift a Sail was then released on October 7 through record label Razor & Tie. In October and November, the band went on a co-headlining US tour with Memphis May Fire. They were supported by Emarosa. For the tour, the group enlisted the help of drummer Tucker Rule, formerly of Thursday. On October 30, a music video was released for "The Deepest Well". It was filmed during the group's tour with Memphis May Fire. On May 26, 2015, a music video was released for "California". In October and November, the group went on a co-headlining US tour with New Found Glory. They were supported by Tigers Jaw.

Critical reception

At Metacritic, which assigns a "weighted average" rating out of 100 to selected independent ratings and reviews from mainstream critics, the album has received a Metascore of 72, based on five reviews, indicating "generally favorable reviews". Three and a half star reviewer for AllMusic, James Christopher Monger, states: "The 13-track set adds some relatively subtle flourishes of electronics to the mix while dialing back a little on Sean Mackin's signature violin playing, but fans looking to conjure up some nostalgia for the band's Ocean Avenue heyday will find what they're looking for on standout cuts like the catchy and propulsive 'Make Me So,' the big-hearted 'Transmission Home,' and rousing 'Deepest Well'."

Track listing
All music written by Ryan Key, Sean Mackin, and Ryan Mendez. All lyrics written by Key.

Personnel
Personnel per booklet.

Yellowcard
 Ryan Key – lead vocals, guitar, programming, piano, percussion
 Sean Mackin – violin, backing vocals, strings arrangement, piano
 Ryan Mendez – guitar, bass, percussion
 Josh Portman – bass

Additional musicians
 Nate Young – drums
 Neal Avron – programming
 Diana Wade – viola
 Joann Whang – cello
Matty Mullins - vocals on "The Deepest Well"

Production and design
 Neal Avron – producer, mixing
 Ted Jensen – mastering
 Erich Talaba – engineer
 Scott Skrzynski – assistant engineer
 Wil Anspach – assistant engineer
 William McMillin – cover art

Chart performance

References

External links

Lift a Sail at YouTube (streamed copy where licensed)

Yellowcard albums
2014 albums
Razor & Tie albums
Albums produced by Neal Avron